Diego Emilio Romero Paschetta (born 5 December 1974 in Córdoba, Argentina) is an Argentine-Italian sailor.

He earned a bronze medal in Laser at the 1999 Pan American Games on Lake Winnipeg, behind Brazil's Robert Scheidt and Mark Mendelblatt of the United States.

Romero competed at the 2000 Summer Olympics and 2004 Summer Olympics for Argentina. He competed at the 2008 Summer Olympics for Italy, where he won a bronze medal in Laser class.

References 

1974 births
Living people
Sportspeople from Córdoba, Argentina
Argentine male sailors (sport)
Italian male sailors (sport)
Olympic sailors of Argentina
Olympic sailors of Italy
Olympic bronze medalists for Italy
Olympic medalists in sailing
Medalists at the 2008 Summer Olympics
Sailors at the 2000 Summer Olympics – Laser
Sailors at the 2004 Summer Olympics – Laser
Sailors at the 2008 Summer Olympics – Laser
Pan American Games silver medalists for Argentina
Pan American Games bronze medalists for Argentina
Sailors at the 1999 Pan American Games
Sailors at the 2003 Pan American Games
Argentine emigrants to Italy
Pan American Games medalists in sailing
Medalists at the 1999 Pan American Games